José Eduardo Pavez (born October 13, 1969) is a Mexican former professional footballer. He played as a midfielder during his career. He was a member of the Mexico national football team competing at the 1992 Summer Olympics in Barcelona, Spain.

See also
List of people from Morelos, Mexico

References

1969 births
Living people
Association football midfielders
Olympic footballers of Mexico
Footballers at the 1992 Summer Olympics
Footballers from Morelos
Mexican footballers